Old Quarter can refer to:
 Old Quarter of Colon, Panama
 Old Quarter, Hanoi, Vietnam
 Old City (Shanghai), China
 Old Quarter Acoustic Cafe, Texas (formerly, Old Quarter)